Culture and Arts Capital of the Turkic World, (Turkish: Türk Dünyası Kültür Başkenti) is a city designated by the TÜRKSOY for a period of one calendar year during which it organises a series of cultural events.

The decision for a cultural capital was made during the tenth meeting of Türksoy in 2010. The first city is selected as Astana for the year 2012. With the 2013 edition, a Eurovision themed song contest, Turkvision Song Contest, debuted.

List of capital cities

See also 
 European Capital of Culture

References

External links 
 TÜRKSOY Website

Turkic culture
International Organization of Turkic Culture